Exuperius is a monotypic snout moth genus described by Carl Heinrich in 1956. Its only species, Exuperius negator, described in the same publication, is found in Peru.

References

Moths described in 1956
Phycitinae
Monotypic moth genera
Moths of South America